Jay Carl Waldman (November 16, 1944 – May 30, 2003) was a United States district judge of the United States District Court for the Eastern District of Pennsylvania and a former federal judicial nominee to the United States Court of Appeals for the Third Circuit.

Education and career

Born in Pittsburgh, Pennsylvania, Waldman received a Bachelor of Science degree in history from University of Wisconsin–Madison in 1966. He received a Bachelor of Laws from University of Pennsylvania Law School in 1969. He was a law clerk for Judge Gwilym A. Price Jr. of the Court of Common Pleas in Pittsburgh from 1969 to 1970. He was in private practice of law in Pittsburgh from 1970 to 1971. He was an Assistant United States Attorney of the Western District of Pennsylvania from 1971 to 1975. He was the Deputy Assistant United States Attorney General of the United States Department of Justice Criminal Division in Washington, D.C., from 1975 to 1977. He was the Director of the Thornburgh for Governor Commission in Philadelphia in 1978. He was a counsel to Governor Dick Thornburgh in Harrisburg from 1979 to 1981. He was the general counsel of the Commonwealth of Pennsylvania in Harrisburg from 1981 to 1986. He was the Commissioner of the Pennsylvania Convention Center Authority from 1986 to 1988. He was in private practice of law in Philadelphia from 1986 to 1988.

Federal judicial service

Waldman was nominated by President Ronald Reagan on August 3, 1988, to a seat on the United States District Court for the Eastern District of Pennsylvania vacated by Judge Daniel Henry Huyett III. Despite the nomination occurring after the Thurmond Rule, he was confirmed by the United States Senate on October 14, 1988, and received his commission on October 17, 1988. His service was terminated on May 30, 2003, due to death.

First nomination to the Third Circuit

On July 26, 1991, President George H. W. Bush nominated Waldman to a seat on the United States Court of Appeals for the Third Circuit. However, with the Senate Judiciary Committee controlled by Democrats, Waldman's nomination languished, and the committee never acted on the nomination before the end of Bush's presidency. President Bill Clinton chose not to renominate Waldman to the Third Circuit.

Second nomination to the Third Circuit

Just before his death in 2003, Waldman was expected to be renominated to the Third Circuit by President George W. Bush to replace Judge Edward R. Becker. Waldman died about a month after being nominated, which was well before the Senate Judiciary Committee had even begun to take up the nomination. Bush eventually wound up nominating Franklin Van Antwerpen to the seat.

Death
Waldman went on an extended medical leave in January 2003 as he battled lung cancer. Waldman died on May 30, 2003, at Thomas Jefferson University Hospital in Philadelphia.

See also
George H. W. Bush judicial appointment controversies

References

Sources
 

1944 births
2003 deaths
20th-century American lawyers
Assistant United States Attorneys
Judges of the United States District Court for the Eastern District of Pennsylvania
Lawyers from Pittsburgh
United States district court judges appointed by Ronald Reagan
20th-century American judges
University of Pennsylvania Law School alumni
University of Wisconsin–Madison College of Letters and Science alumni